The VI Games of the Small States of Europe were held in 1995 by the Grand Duchy of Luxembourg.

Competitions

Medals count

References

San Marino Olympic Committee

 
Games of the Small States of Europe
International sports competitions hosted by Luxembourg
Games Of The Small States Of Europe, 1995
Games Of The Small States Of Europe, 1995
Games Of The Small States Of Europe
Multi-sport events in Luxembourg
Sports competitions in Luxembourg City
Games Of The Small States Of Europe
Games Of The Small States Of Europe
Games Of The Small States Of Europe, 1995